Rudnik is a rural locality (a settlement) in Proletarsky Selsoviet, Altaysky District, Altai Krai, Russia. The population was 75 as of 2013. There are 2 streets.

Geography 
Rudnik is located 17 km south of Altayskoye (the district's administrative centre) by road. Sarasa is the nearest rural locality.

References 

Rural localities in Altaysky District, Altai Krai